Villalva is a surname. Notable people with the surname include:

Daniel Villalva (born 1992), Argentine footballer
Lira Villalva (born 1983), Ecuadorian lawyer and politician 
María Guillermina Valdes Villalva (1939-1991), American academic and activist
Romeo Villalva Tabuena (born 1921), Filipino painter and printmaker